The following is a partial list of the "D" codes for Medical Subject Headings (MeSH), as defined by the United States National Library of Medicine (NLM).

This list continues the information at List of MeSH codes (D09). Codes following these are found at List of MeSH codes (D12). For other MeSH codes, see List of MeSH codes.

The source for this content is the set of 2006 MeSH Trees from the NLM.

– lipids

– ceroid

– fats

– dietary fats
  – butter
  – cholesterol, dietary
  – dietary fats, unsaturated
  – cod liver oil
  – corn oil
  – cottonseed oil
  – fatty acids, omega-3
  – alpha-linolenic acid
  – docosahexaenoic acids
  – eicosapentaenoic acid
  – safflower oil
  – sesame oil
  – soybean oil
  – fat emulsions, intravenous
  – margarine

– fats, unsaturated
  – castor oil
  – cod liver oil
  – corn oil
  – cottonseed oil
  – croton oil
  – linseed oil
  – safflower oil
  – sesame oil
  – soybean oil
  – triolein

– fatty acids

– caprylates
  – octanoic acids

– decanoic acids
  – decanoates

– eicosanoic acids
  – phytanic acid

– fatty acids, nonesterified

– fatty acids, unsaturated
  – arachidonic acids
  – arachidonic acid
  – Hydroxyeicosatetraenoic acids
  – 12-hydroxy-5,8,10,14-eicosatetraenoic acid
  – eicosanoids
  – 5,8,11,14-eicosatetraynoic acid
  – 8,11,14-eicosatrienoic acid
  – arachidonic acids
  – arachidonic acid
  – Hydroxyeicosatetraenoic acids
  – 12-hydroxy-5,8,10,14-eicosatetraenoic acid
  – isoprostanes
  – f2-isoprostanes
  – leukotrienes
  – leukotriene a4
  – leukotriene b4
  – srs-a
  – leukotriene c4
  – leukotriene d4
  – leukotriene e4
  – prostaglandins
  – prostaglandin endoperoxides
  – prostaglandins g
  – prostaglandins h
  – prostaglandin h2
  – 15-hydroxy-11 alpha,9 alpha-(epoxymethano)prosta-5,13-dienoic acid
  – prostaglandins a
  – prostaglandins b
  – prostaglandins d
  – prostaglandin d2
  – prostaglandins e
  – dinoprostone
  – prostaglandins f
  – dinoprost
  – 6-ketoprostaglandin f1 alpha
  – prostaglandins i
  – epoprostenol
  – thromboxanes
  – thromboxane a2
  – thromboxane b2
  – eicosapentaenoic acid
  – lipoxins
  – prostaglandins
  – prostaglandin endoperoxides
  – prostaglandins g
  – prostaglandins h
  – prostaglandin h2
  – 15-hydroxy-11 alpha,9 alpha-(epoxymethano)prosta-5,13-dienoic acid
  – prostaglandins a
  – prostaglandins b
  – prostaglandins d
  – prostaglandin d2
  – prostaglandins e
  – alprostadil
  – dinoprostone
  – prostaglandins f
  – dinoprost
  – 6-ketoprostaglandin f1 alpha
  – prostaglandins i
  – epoprostenol
  – prostaglandins, synthetic
  – iloprost
  – prostaglandin endoperoxides, synthetic
  – prostaglandins a, synthetic
  – prostaglandins e, synthetic
  – arbaprostil
  – 16,16-dimethylprostaglandin e2
  – enprostil
  – misoprostol
  – rioprostil
  – prostaglandins f, synthetic
  – carboprost
  – cloprostenol
  – thromboxanes
  – fatty acids, essential
  – arachidonic acids
  – arachidonic acid
  – linoleic acids
  – linoleic acid
  – linolenic acids
  – alpha-linolenic acid
  – gamma-linolenic acid
  – fatty acids, monounsaturated
  – alprostadil
  – capsaicin
  – cilastatin
  – crotonic acids
  – crotonates
  – erucic acids
  – 6-ketoprostaglandin f1 alpha
  – oleic acids
  – oleic acid
  – ricinoleic acids
  – undecylenic acids
  – fatty acids, omega-3
  – alpha-linolenic acid
  – docosahexaenoic acids
  – eicosapentaenoic acid
  – fatty acids, omega-6
  – gamma-linolenic acid
  – linoleic acids
  – linoleic acid
  – linoleic acids, conjugated
  – gefarnate
  – ionomycin
  – isoprostanes
  – f2-isoprostanes
  – linolenic acids
  – alpha-linolenic acid
  – gamma-linolenic acid
  – sorbic acid
  – trans fatty acids

– fatty acids, volatile
  – acetic acids
  – acetic acid
  – butyric acids
  – butyric acid
  – butyrates
  – crotonic acids
  – crotonates
  – 3-hydroxybutyric acid
  – hydroxybutyrates
  – caproates
  – hexanoic acids
  – propionates
  – propionic acids
  – valerates
  – pentanoic acids
  – gemfibrozil
  – valproic acid

– heptanoic acids
  – heptanoates

– lauric acids
  – laurates

– mupirocin

– mycolic acids

– mycophenolic acid

– myristic acids
  – myristates
  – myristic acid

– palmitic acids
  – palmitates
  – palmitic acid

– prostanoic acids

– sodium morrhuate

– stearic acids
  – stearates

– fatty alcohols

– butanols
  – 1-butanol
  – chlorobutanol
  – tert-butyl alcohol

– dodecanol
  – sodium dodecyl sulfate

– dolichol
  – dolichol phosphates

– farnesol

– heptanol

– hexanols

– octanols
  – 1-octanol

– pentanols

– sodium tetradecyl sulfate

– glycerides

– diglycerides

– monoglycerides

– triglycerides
  – triacetin
  – triolein

– glycolipids

– cord factors

– galactolipids

– glycosphingolipids
  – acidic glycosphingolipids
  – antigens, cd15
  – gangliosides
  – g(m1) ganglioside
  – g(m2) ganglioside
  – g(m3) ganglioside
  – sulfoglycosphingolipids
  – neutral glycosphingolipids
  – ceramides
  – cerebrosides
  – galactosylceramides
  – glucosylceramides
  – globosides
  – lactosylceramides
  – trihexosylceramides
  – sphingomyelins
  – psychosine

– glycosylphosphatidylinositols

– polyisoprenyl phosphate sugars
  – polyisoprenyl phosphate monosaccharides
  – dolichol monophosphate mannose
  – polyisoprenyl phosphate oligosaccharides

– lipid peroxides

– lipofuscin

– lipopolysaccharides

– lipid a

– o antigens

– lipoproteins

– chylomicrons

– lipoprotein(a)

– lipoprotein-x

– lipoproteins, hdl
  – lipoproteins, hdl cholesterol

– lipoproteins, ldl
  – lipoproteins, ldl cholesterol

– lipoproteins, vldl
  – lipoproteins, vldl cholesterol

– platelet factor 3

– vitellogenins

– membrane lipids

– lipid bilayers

– phospholipids
  – glycerophosphates
  – phosphatidic acids
  – glycerophospholipids
  – glycerylphosphorylcholine
  – phosphatidylcholines
  – dimyristoylphosphatidylcholine
  – 1,2-dipalmitoylphosphatidylcholine
  – phosphatidylethanolamines
  – phosphatidylglycerols
  – cardiolipins
  – phosphatidylinositols
  – glycosylphosphatidylinositols
  – phosphatidylinositol phosphates
  – phosphatidylinositol 4,5-diphosphate
  – phosphatidylserines
  – phospholipid ethers
  – plasmalogens
  – platelet activating factor
  – lysophospholipids
  – lysophosphatidylcholines
  – sphingomyelins

– proteolipids
  – myelin proteolipid protein

– sphingolipids
  – glycosphingolipids
  – acidic glycosphingolipids
  – antigens, cd15
  – gangliosides
  – g(m1) ganglioside
  – g(m2) ganglioside
  – g(m3) ganglioside
  – sulfoglycosphingolipids
  – neutral glycosphingolipids
  – ceramides
  – cerebrosides
  – galactosylceramides
  – glucosylceramides
  – globosides
  – lactosylceramides
  – trihexosylceramides
  – sphingomyelins
  – psychosine

– sterols
  – cholecalciferol
  – hydroxycholecalciferols
  – calcifediol
  – dihydroxycholecalciferols
  – calcitriol
  – 24,25-dihydroxyvitamin d 3
  – cholesterol
  – azacosterol
  – cholestanol
  – cholesterol, dietary
  – cholesterol esters
  – dehydrocholesterols
  – desmosterol
  – hydroxycholesterols
  – ketocholesterols
  – lipoproteins, hdl cholesterol
  – lipoproteins, ldl cholesterol
  – lipoproteins, vldl cholesterol
  – dihydrotachysterol
  – ergocalciferols
  – 25-hydroxyvitamin d 2
  – lanosterol

– oils

– fish oils
  – cod liver oil
  – fatty acids, omega-3
  – docosahexaenoic acids
  – eicosapentaenoic acid

– oils, volatile
  – Tea Tree Oil (Melaleuca Oil)
  – turpentine

– plant oils
  – castor oil
  – corn oil
  – cottonseed oil
  – croton oil
  – iodized oil
  – ethiodized oil
  – linseed oil
  – safflower oil
  – sesame oil
  – soybean oil
  – Tea Tree Oil (Melaleuca Oil)

– phospholipids

– sphingolipids

– sterols

– cholesterol

– waxes

– lanolin

The list continues at List of MeSH codes (D12).

D10